The 2007 UCI Cyclo-cross World Championships – Men's elite race was held on Sunday 28 January 2007 as a part of the 2007 UCI Cyclo-cross World Championships in Hooglede-Gits, Belgium.

Summary 

In an exciting world championships Gerben de Knegt was the first taking the lead and was booed by the 40,000 spectators. Top favourites Sven Nys and Bart Wellens took an early lead breaking away from the pack, but were set back by bad luck as they were brought down by a plastic block that was touched by a television motorcycle. Both continued the race, but had to chase the leaders from behind. Due to the incident defending champion Erwin Vervecken was the only leader with a small gap to the rest of the peloton. Vervecken fell as well however, as he was trying to climb up a hill and was overtaken by Richard Groenendaal who took the initiative and looked secure to win his second world title, with the big favourites way behind. Groenendaal however also crashed and Italian champion Enrico Franzoi together with Jonathan Page were in the lead. Vervecken in the meanwhile was slightly behind the two and came back. Franzoi couldn't keep up driving through the sand and was set back and had to fight for his bronze medal. In the final lap both leaders tried to create a gap several times, but were taken back by the other. Until Vervecken had an excellent line choice on the last major climb of the course before the finish. Doing so shot him past Page as he went on to successfully defend his world title. Franzoi was able to hold his third position for the bronze medal, while Bart Wellens came in fourth with what was later reported a broken wrist.

Ranking 

Seven riders abandoned the race: Kamil Ausbuher (Czech Republic), Davy Commeyne (Belgium), Mohamed Conway (Zimbabwe), Masahiko Mifune (Japan), Tshabalala Nqobizitha (Zimbabwe), Radomír Šimůnek (Czech Republic), Malte Urban (Germany) and Camiel Van Den Bergh (Netherlands). Francis Mourey (France) did not start due to a fall two days before the World Championship.

Notes

External links
 Union Cycliste Internationale

Men's elite race
UCI Cyclo-cross World Championships – Men's elite race
2007 in cyclo-cross